Ahlam (Arabic أحلام 'dreams') may refer to:

People
Ahlam (singer), Ahlam Ali Al Shamsi (born 1969), Emirati singer
 (1933-1997), Egyptian singer and actress
Ahlam Amrani (born 1991), Algerian volleyball player
Ahlam Khudr, Sudanese activist
Ahlam Mosteghanemi (born 1953), Algerian writer
Ahlam al-Nasr (fl. 2014), Syrian Arabic poet
Ahlam Shibli (born 1970),  Palestinian photographer
Ahlam Tamimi, Jordanian woman who assisted the 2001 Sbarro restaurant suicide bombing
 (born 1938), Iraqi singer and actress

Places
Ahlam, Iran, a village in Ahlamerestaq-e Shomali Rural District, Mazandaran Province, Iran

See also

Ahlamu, a Semitic semi-nomadic people